Matthew Pewtner (born 26 December 1990) is a Welsh rugby union player for Newport RFC and the Newport Gwent Dragons regional team. A winger, he has represented Wales at Under-20 level.

Pewtner previously played for Ystrad Mynach RFC, Blackwood RFC, Cross Keys RFC, and the Newport Gwent Dragons Under-20 regional team. He made his debut for the Newport Gwent Dragons versus Sale Sharks on 6 November 2009 as a second-half replacement.

On 22 December 2009 he was named in the Wales Under 20 Squad for the 2010 Under-20 Six Nations tournament.

Pewtner was born in Newport, Wales and retired from rugby aged 25 in February 2016 due to a concussion injury.

References

External links
Newport Gwent Dragons profile

Welsh rugby union players
Dragons RFC players
Newport RFC players
1990 births
Living people
Rugby union players from Newport, Wales
People educated at Ysgol Gyfun Cwm Rhymni
Rugby union wings